George Reddy (15 January 1947 – 14 April 1972) was an Indian student leader and social activist. He was a Gold medallist  (PhD) in nuclear physics at Osmania University, Hyderabad. His untimely death led to the formation of the Progressive Democratic Students Union (PDSU), a student body on the campus of the university that took its name from the "PDS" imprint he had used to publish pamphlets.

Biography 
He was born in Palghat (now Palakkad) on 15 January 1947, just before India's independence, in the then Madras Presidency. His father Challa Raghunadh Reddy was a Telugu from Chittoor, while his mother Leela Varghese was a Malyali from Travancore. They met while studying at the Presidency College, Madras. The family later moved to Andhra Pradesh from where George did his early schooling; at St. Gabriel's High School, Warangal and St. Paul's High School, Hyderabad. He ultimately got his intermediate degree from the Nizam College in Hyderabad.

He was known for his helping nature, and was also a kick boxer.

His enthusiasm for nuclear physics earned him a university gold medal while during his postgraduate studies at Osmania University.

His brother Cyril Reddy (died 2016), was also an activist in Hyderabad. A lawyer, Cyril was a part of the legal team led by Bojja Tharakam. Cyril's wife, Gita Ramaswamy, is a social activist and writer.

Student politics 
Reddy is now primarily known for his promotion of Marxist ideas and his opposition to social discrimination and economic inequality. According to a student friend, he was inspired by "the emerging Black Panthers, started in 1966 in the US, the Vietnamese people's struggle against US imperialism and the peasant uprisings in Naxalbari and Srikakulam."

Reddy was stabbed to death in an attack at his college campus on 14 April 1972.

Reddy's student activist movement was a part of a string of student protests against the Indira Gandhi government during the 1970s in India. After his death other student protests cropped up across the country such as the Navnirman Andolan (Gujarat) and the Bihar Movement. The latter of which lead to The Emergency and eventually to the ouster of the Indira Gandhi government in 1977.

Legacy
 Crisis on the Campus (1971) is a short documentary film directed by Fali Bilimoria. In 2012, at an event marking his fortieth death anniversary, the film was premiered and a book titled Reminiscences of George Reddy was released.
 Alajadi is a 1990 film by Bharadwaja Thammareddy. The lead character named Ravi, based on Reddy, is played by Bhanu Chander.
 Mani Ratnam's movie, Aaytha Ezhuthu/Yuva was loosely based on his story and Suriya/Ajay Devgan played his character in the respective Tamil and Hindi film versions.
 Jeena Hai To Marna Seekho: The Life and Times of George Reddy by Gita Ramaswamy (Reddy's sister in law), a 152-page book named was published in 2016 by the Hyderabad Book Trust.
 George Reddy is a 2019 biopic by B. Jeevan Reddy. Sandeep Madhav portrays George in the film.

Bibliography

References

1940s births
1972 deaths
Malayali people
Telugu people
Indian communists
Osmania University alumni
Student politics in India
People murdered in Andhra Pradesh
Deaths by stabbing in India
Indian murder victims